Tony Steward (born September 19, 1992) is a former American football linebacker of the National Football League (NFL). He was drafted by the Buffalo Bills in the sixth round of the 2015 NFL Draft. He played college football at Clemson. Steward was considered one of the best linebacker prospects in his class, and earned the 2010 high school version of the Dick Butkus Award.

High school career 
A native of Hastings, Florida, Steward attended Pedro Menendez High School in St. Augustine, Florida, where he was coached by Keith Cromwell. On mediocre 5–6 and 5–7 teams, respectively, in his junior and senior years, Steward was an all-state selection at linebacker. As a senior, he had 81 tackles and five sacks and scored 10 touchdowns on offense. Following his senior year, he received a nomination to the 2010 U.S. Army All-American Bowl.

Regarded as a five-star recruit by Rivals.com, Steward was ranked as the No. 1 outside linebacker prospect in his class. Recruited by virtually every school in the country, he took official visits to UCLA, Clemson University, and Florida State. On National Signing Day 2011, Steward announced his decision to attend Clemson University.

College career 
As a true freshman at Clemson University, Steward played a back-up role and had five tackles in 36 snaps over five games. On October 18, 2011, he tore an ACL in practice and would miss the rest of the season.

In 2012, Steward returned from injury and was a back-up to senior Jonathan Willard at weakside linebacker, and saw action on special teams. Appearing in all 13 games, Steward had 26 tackles, 16 of which were unassisted.

Professional career

Buffalo Bills 
Steward was drafted by the Buffalo Bills in the sixth round (188th overall) of the 2015 NFL Draft. On May 18, 2015, Steward signed a four-year contract with the Buffalo Bills. On December 10, 2015, the Buffalo Bills placed Steward on injured reserve. Steward was released on April 19, 2016.

New England Patriots 
On April 22, 2016, Steward signed with the New England Patriots. On May 11, 2016, the Patriots waived Steward.

New Orleans Saints 
On May 16, 2016, Steward was signed by the Saints. On August 30, 2016, he was placed on injured reserve.

Personal 
Steward was born in Hastings, Florida. He became engaged to his college sweetheart, Brittany Burns, in December 2015. However, Burns died of ovarian cancer in February 2016.

References

External links 
Buffalo Bills bio
Clemson Tigers bio
Rivals.com Recruiting Profile
Scout.com Recruiting Profile

1992 births
Living people
People from St. Augustine, Florida
Players of American football from Florida
African-American players of American football
American football linebackers
Clemson Tigers football players
Buffalo Bills players
New England Patriots players
New Orleans Saints players
21st-century African-American sportspeople